Cuspidaria tomricei is a species of marine bivalve mollusc in the family Cuspidariidae.

Original description
  Poppe G.T. & Tagaro S. (2016). New marine mollusks from the central Philippines in the families Aclididae, Chilodontidae, Cuspidariidae, Nuculanidae, Nystiellidae, Seraphsidae and Vanikoridae. Visaya. 4(5): 83-103.
page(s): 84.

References

Cuspidariidae